Adil Babikir is a Sudanese literary critic and translator into and out of English and Arabic. He has translated several novels, short stories and poems by renowned Sudanese writers and edited the anthology Modern Sudanese Poetry. He lives and works in Abu Dhabi, United Arab Emirates.

Biography 
Babikir graduated from the Faculty of Arts, University of Khartoum, and also holds an M.A. in Translation from the Faculty of Languages, Sudan University of Science and Technology. Babikir was employed by the state-run Sudan News Agency (SUNA), in its English news desk. Later, he moved to Saudi Arabia and worked for several companies in business and general translation. Next, he joined the US Embassy in Riyadh as information officer for more than ten years. He then moved to the United Arab Emirates, working in translation and business promotion for several companies.

Babikir's translations to English have appeared in Africa World Press, Banipal, Al-Dawha Magazine, and others. His published translations include The Jungo: Stakes of the Earth and The Messiah of Darfur, excerpted in the Los Angeles Review of Books, by Abdel Aziz Baraka Sakin, and Mansi: A Rare Man on his Own Way by Sudanese writerTayeb Salih. For the latter, he received the 2020 Sheikh Hamad Translation Award. Further, Babikir also translated Summer Maize (2017), a collection of short stories by Sudanese-British writer Leila Aboulela, from English to Arabic. 

Babikir is the editor and translator of the anthology Modern Sudanese Poetry, published in 2019, and translated the texts of Literary Sudans: An anthology of literature from Sudan and South Sudan. His study titled The Beauty Hunters: Sudanese Bedouin Poetry, Evolution and Impact was announced for April 2023 by University of Nebraska Press.

Among his works of literary criticism, he published an essay in 2013, two years after the independence of South Sudan, about South Sudanese writer Mongo Zambeiri on the conflict between politics and culture. In 2021, he received the Africa Institute's Global Africa Translation Fellowship. Babikir has contributed several translations to literary magazines such as Banipal and ArabLit & ArabLit Quarterly.

See also 
 Sudanese literature
 List of Sudanese writers

References

Further reading 
 Babikir, Adil (ed.) (2019). Modern Sudanese Poetry: An Anthology. Lincoln, NE, USA.

External links 
 Official webpage
 Sudanese literature available in English
 Poem Three Songs for the Ghajar, by Mughira Harbya, translated by Adil Babikir

Living people
21st-century Sudanese writers
Sudanese male writers
Sudanese writers
Translators from Arabic
Sudanese translators
University of Khartoum alumni
Year of birth missing (living people)
Sudan University of Science and Technology alumni